Ohuka  is a village and rural community located in the Wairoa District of the Hawke's Bay Region, on New Zealand's North Island.

The area was settled by farmers in the early 20th century. It has a landscape of rolling hills and farmland.

Education
Ohuka School is a Year 1–8 co-educational state primary school.

References

Wairoa District
Populated places in the Hawke's Bay Region